Ugly Rumours was the name of a rock band founded in part by future UK prime minister Tony Blair, while studying law at St John's College, Oxford during the early 1970s; he sang and played guitar. The band's name came from the cover of the Grateful Dead's album From the Mars Hotel.

Other members of the band were Mark Ellen, who later went on to present BBC TV's The Old Grey Whistle Test music show and become the founding editor of British music magazine Q and Adam Sharples, currently Director General, Employment Group at the Department for Work and Pensions.

On 19 January 2006, Channel 4 broadcast a docudrama entitled Tony Blair: Rock Star, which stated that the band's first gig was at Corpus Christi College, Oxford, during which the drum kit fell apart, and that the band played a total of six gigs before disbanding. It was also mentioned that Blair passed his audition for the band primarily because he was the only auditionee who knew all the words to the song he was asked to sing, "(I Can't Get No) Satisfaction" by Mick Jagger of the Rolling Stones, whom he imitated during his performances.

The Stop the War Coalition released a single in February 2007 credited to Ugly Rumours, with the band fronted by a lookalike claiming to be Tony Blair.  The single, a cover version of Edwin Starr's hit "War", had a notable video. It reached number 6 in the UK midweek charts on 28 February, and charted at number 21 on 4 March.

References

External links
Interview with Mark Ellen: bassist, The Guardian
Spoof review of The Ugly Rumours, BBC Oxford, 2003

English rock music groups
Culture of the University of Oxford
St John's College, Oxford
Corpus Christi College, Oxford
Tony Blair
History of the University of Oxford
Musical groups from Oxford